John Fisher Stokes  (19 September 1912, Bexhill, Sussex – 11 May 2010) was a physician and surgeon, who earned a footnote in the history of the Royal College of Physicians by becoming part of the first married couple who were both elected FRCP.

Biography
After education at Haileybury School, John Fisher Stokes matriculated at Gonville and Caius College, Cambridge, where he graduated in 1937 MB MChir (Cantab.) after medical study at University College Hospital Medical School. In 1937 he qualified MRCS, LRCP from University College Hospital (UCH), where he was a house physician and house surgeon. At UCH he successively became a resident medical officer and a medical registrar. In 1939 he qualified MRCP. Stokes joined in 1942 the RAMC, served as a physician in Burma Campaign, was mentioned in dispatches, and attained the rank of lieutenant colonel. He was a consultant physician at UCH from 1946 until he retired in 1977. In 1947 he graduated MD and was elected FRCP. In 1975 he was elected FRCPE.

Stokes gave the Bradshaw Lecture in 1973 and the Harveian Oration in 1981. For many years he was a trustee of the Leeds Castle Foundation, a private charitable trust.

In 1940 he married the microbiologist Joan Stokes née Rooke, who was elected FRCP in 1947. They were married for 69 years and John died a few months after Joan died. They were survived by a son, a daughter, five grandchildren, and three great-grandchildren. For a number of years, John and Joan Stokes lived next door to, and were friends of, the actor Alastair Sim and his wife, Naomi.

Selected publications

References

1912 births
2010 deaths
20th-century English medical doctors
Alumni of Gonville and Caius College, Cambridge
Alumni of the UCL Medical School
Physicians of University College Hospital
Fellows of the Royal College of Physicians
Fellows of the Royal College of Physicians of Edinburgh
Royal Army Medical Corps officers
British Army personnel of World War II